Peer Stefan Wenzel (born 5 May 1962) is a German agricultural economist and politician for the Alliance 90/The Greens who has been serving as a member of the German Bundestag since the 2021 elections, representing the Cuxhaven – Stade II district. 

In addition to his parliamentary work, Wenzel has been serving as Parliamentary State Secretary at the Federal Ministry for Economic Affairs and Climate Action in the coalition government of Chancellor Olaf Scholz since 2022.

Political career

Career in state politics

A trained agricultural economist, Wenzel was elected to the Lower Saxon Landtag in the 1998 state elections, and has been re-elected on two occasions. In 2004 he succeeded Rebecca Harms as chairman of the Green Party's parliamentary group. Wenzel was a Green Party delegate to the Federal Convention for the purpose of electing the President of Germany in 2009 and 2017.

On 19 February 2013, Wenzel was sworn in as Deputy Minister-President and State Minister for the Environment, Energy and Climate Protection in the state government of Minister-President Stephan Weil. As one of the state's representatives at the Bundesrat, he served as chairman of the Committee on the Environment, Nature Protection and Reactor Safety.

In 2014, Wenzel led the negotiations on the future of controversial radioactive waste disposal facility in Gorleben. From 2014 and 2016, he was one of the members of Germany's temporary National Commission on the Disposal of Radioactive Waste.

When the Green Party had to leave the coalition government following 2017 state elections, Wenzel was succeeded by Olaf Lies. From 2017 until 2021, he chaired the State Parliament's Finance Committee and the Audit Committee.

Member of the German Parliament, 2021–present
In parliament, Wenzel has been serving on the Committee on European Affairs and the Committee on the Environment, Nature Conservation, Nuclear Safety and Consumer Protection. In addition to his committee assignments, he is a member of the German delegation to the Franco-German Parliamentary Assembly.

Other activities
 German Energy Agency (DENA), Ex-Officio Chairman of the Supervisory Board (since 2022)
 Evangelical Church in Germany (EKD), Member of the Synod
 German Federal Environmental Foundation (DBU), Member of the Board of Trustees
 Federal Network Agency for Electricity, Gas, Telecommunications, Post and Railway (BNetzA), Alternate Member of the Advisory Board
 Erneuerbare Energien Göttingen GmbH & Co. KG, Member of the Advisory Board (-2013)

Personal life
Wenzel is married and has three daughters. The family lives on an estate of low-energy houses.

References

External links

1962 births
Living people
Alliance 90/The Greens politicians
Members of the Landtag of Lower Saxony
Ministers of the Lower Saxony State Government
People from Nakskov
Members of the Bundestag 2021–2025